A geuteling (plural geutelingen) is a traditional food of the Flemish Ardennes region of Belgium. It bears some similarity to a pancake.

Origin 
Geutelingen began as a food to celebrate the Catholic feast of Saint Apollonia. Families made their own dough, and they brought their dough to the local bakery to be baked. The next weekend the geutelingen were reheated in a casserole and eaten with the whole family.

Saint Apollonia is the patron saint of dentists, and there is a tradition that the geuteling confers year-long immunity to toothache.

The geuteling today

Today, the religious association has almost disappeared, but the feast of the geutelingen is still organised on the first weekend after the feast of Saint Apollonia: February 9. There is also a tradition of tossing the geuteling, as pancakes are tossed elsewhere.

Elst, part of the community of Brakel in East Flanders, promotes the geuteling in the Flemish Ardennes and elsewhere in the country. Elst is known as the village of the geutelingen.

Preparation 
Geutelingen are made from flour, milk, eggs, yeast, a little salt and a little cinnamon. The liquid dough is poured onto a clay tile in a very hot oven. The high temperature gives the geuteling its typical odour and flavour.

External links 
 http://www.geutelingen.be

Belgian cuisine
Flemish culture